In California, councils of governments are voluntary organizations of local governments within a specific region. They are organized as joint powers authorities and funded by dues from their member governments. They play a number of official roles in state governmental processes such as developing regional housing need allocations (RHNAs). 

The state has 23 councils of governments:

 Association of Bay Area Governments
 Association of Monterey Bay Area Governments
 Butte County Association of Governments
 Calaveras County Council of Governments
 Coachella Valley Association of Governments
 Council of San Benito County Governments
 Fresno Council of Governments
 Humboldt County Association of Governments
 Kern Council of Governments
 Lake County/City Area Planning Council
 Mendocino Council of Governments
 Merced County Association of Governments
 Orange County Council of Governments
 Sacramento Area Council of Governments
 San Bernardino Council of Governments
 San Luis Obispo Council of Governments
 San Joaquin Council of Governments
 Santa Barbara County Association of Governments
 South Bay Cities Council of Governments
 Southern California Association of Governments
 Tulare County Association of Governments
 Stanislaus Council of Governments
 Western Riverside Council of Governments

References 

Councils of governments